Nay Zin Latt is a Burmese politician and businessman. He is a former adviser to President Thein Sein, serving as part of the political advisory group from April 2011 to April 2015. He retired from his post on 30 April 2015 to establish the National Development Party. Nay Zin Lat is a former military officer.

References 

Burmese military personnel
Burmese civil servants
Burmese politicians
Officers Training School, Bahtoo alumni